Natsuki Nishi (born June 4, 1972) is a Japanese sprint canoer who competed in the mid-1990s. She was eliminated in the semifinals of the K-4 500 m event at the 1996 Summer Olympics in Atlanta.

External links
Sports-Reference.com profile

1972 births
Canoeists at the 1996 Summer Olympics
Japanese female canoeists
Living people
Olympic canoeists of Japan
Place of birth missing (living people)